Estes Foster "Easy" Parham (December 27, 1921 – October 4, 1982) was an American professional basketball player. Parham was selected in the 1948 BAA draft by the St. Louis Bombers after a collegiate career at Texas Wesleyan. He played for the Bombers for two seasons and then the Philadelphia Warriors for one season before ending his BAA/NBA career.

BAA/NBA career statistics

Regular season

Playoffs

References

External links

1921 births
1982 deaths
American men's basketball players
Basketball players from Texas
Forwards (basketball)
Guards (basketball)
Philadelphia Warriors players
Sportspeople from Fort Worth, Texas
St. Louis Bombers (NBA) draft picks
St. Louis Bombers (NBA) players
Texas Wesleyan Rams men's basketball players